Enicodes is a genus of longhorn beetles of the subfamily Lamiinae, containing the following species:

 Enicodes fichteli (Schreibers, 1902)
 Enicodes montrouzieri Montrouzier, 1861
 Enicodes schreibersii Thomson, 1865

References

Enicodini